Sea Level is the 1977 eponymous debut album by Sea Level which was released on the Capricorn Records label.

Critical reception

On AllMusic Dave Lynch wrote, "Of course, the Allmans sound was a major touchstone for Sea Level; certainly, Leavell's pianism had reached its largest audience ever with his solo break on "Jessica", and he would bring similar stylings to his quartet's 1977 eponymous debut album. But Sea Level didn't need to stand in the shadow of any other group, as the debut made clear.... Sea Level was a fine debut from a killer quartet..."

Track listing
All songs written by Chuck Leavell, except where noted.
"The Rain in Spain" – 6:47
"Shake a Leg" (Edward Hoerner) – 3:53
"Tidal Wave" – 5:40
"Country Fool" – 3:39
"Nothing Matters But the Fever" – 7:20
"Grand Larceny" (Neil Larsen)  –5:22
"Scarborough Fair" (Traditional) – 5:32
"Just a Good Feeling" – 3:01

Personnel
 Chuck Leavell – keyboards, lead vocals
 Jimmy Nalls – guitars, vocals
 Lamar Williams – bass, vocals
 Jai Johanny Johanson – drums, percussion
 Ed Dowling – trumpet

References

1977 debut albums
Capricorn Records albums
albums produced by Stewart Levine